Sarcodon quercinofibulatus is a species of tooth fungus in the family Bankeraceae. Found in Spain, where it grows under Quercus petraea, it was described as new to science in 2011. The cap cuticle breaks up in age into concentric brown scales, revealing the cream-coloured brown flesh underneath. Spines on the underside of the cap are 5–8 mm long. They are initially cream, but become gray to grayish-brown in maturity. Application of a solution of potassium hydroxide turns the flesh grayish-green. The spores of S. quercinofibulatus are spherical, or nearly so, and typically measure 6.5–7.4 by 5.4–6.4 µm.

References

External links

Fungi described in 2011
Fungi of Europe
quercinofibulatus